Andrew Brooke Miller FRSL (born 29 April 1960) is an English novelist.

Life and career
Miller was born in Bristol. He grew up in the West Country and has lived in Spain, Japan, Ireland and France. He was educated at Dauntsey's School, and after gaining a first-class degree in English at Middlesex Polytechnic, completed an MA in Creative Writing at the University of East Anglia in 1991. In 1995 he wrote a PhD in Critical and Creative Writing at Lancaster University. For his first book Ingenious Pain he received three awards, the James Tait Black Memorial Award for Fiction, the International Dublin Literary Award; and the Grinzane Cavour Prize in Italy. The book has been translated into 36 languages. Miller currently lives in Witham Friary in Somerset with his daughter Frieda.

Bibliography
 Ingenious Pain (1997, Sceptre)
 Casanova (1998, Sceptre)
 Oxygen (2001, Sceptre)
 The Optimists (2005, Sceptre)
 One Morning Like a Bird (2008, Sceptre)
 Pure (2011, Sceptre)
 The Crossing (2015, Sceptre)
Now We Shall Be Entirely Free (2018, Sceptre)
The Slowworm's Song (2022, Sceptre)

Awards
 1997 James Tait Black Memorial Prize, Fiction Award, Ingenious Pain
 1997 Premio Grinzane Cavour (Italy), Best Foreign Fiction, Ingenious Pain
 1999 International Dublin Literary Award, Winner, Ingenious Pain
 2001 Booker Prize, Shortlist, Oxygen
 2001 Whitbread Novel Award, Shortlist, Oxygen
 2011 Costa Book Awards, Best Novel, Pure
 2011 Costa Book Awards, Costa Book of the Year, Pure
 2019 Walter Scott Prize shortlist, Now We Shall Be Entirely Free

References

External links
 
 

1960 births
Living people
People educated at Dauntsey's School
Alumni of Middlesex University
Alumni of the University of East Anglia
Alumni of Lancaster University
20th-century British novelists
21st-century British novelists
Costa Book Award winners
James Tait Black Memorial Prize recipients
Fellows of the Royal Society of Literature
British male novelists
20th-century British male writers
21st-century British male writers
People from Mendip District